Martine Irma Robbeets (24 October 1972) is a Belgian comparative linguist and japanologist. She is known for the Transeurasian languages hypothesis, which groups the Japonic, Koreanic, Tungusic, Mongolic, and Turkic languages together into a single language family.

Education
Robbeets received a Ph.D. in Comparative Linguistics from Leiden University, and also received a master's degree in Korean studies from Leiden University. She also holds a master's degree in Japanese studies from KU Leuven.

Career and research
In addition to being a lecturer at the University of Mainz, she is also a group leader at the Max Planck Institute for the Science of Human History in Jena, Germany.

In 2017, Robbeets proposed that Japanese (and possibly Korean) originated as a hybrid language. She proposed that the ancestral home of the Turkic, Mongolic, and Tungusic languages was somewhere in northwestern Manchuria. A group of those proto-Altaic ("Transeurasian") speakers would have migrated south into the modern Liaoning province, where they would have been mostly assimilated by an agricultural community with an Austronesian-like language. The fusion of the two languages would have resulted in proto-Japanese and proto-Korean.

In 2018, Robbeets and Bouckaert used Bayesian phylolinguistic methods to argue for the coherence of the Altaic languages, which they refer to as the Transeurasian languages.

Selected works
 Robbeets, M.; Savelyev, A.: Language dispersal beyond farming. John Benjamins Publishing, Amsterdam (2017)
 Robbeets, M.: Diachrony of verb morphology: Japanese and the Transeurasian languages. de Gruyter Mouton, Berlin (2015)
 Robbeets, M.; Bisang, W. (eds.): Paradigm change: in the Transeurasian languages and beyond. Benjamins, Amsterdam (2014)
 Robbeets, M.: Is Japanese related to Korean, Tungusic, Mongolic and Turkic? Harrassowitz, Wiesbaden (2005)

References

Living people
Linguists of Altaic languages
Paleolinguists
Linguists from Belgium
Max Planck Institute for the Science of Human History
1972 births